Love on the Line may refer to:

 Love on the Line (album) (reissued as Stop Space Return) or the title song, by Crazy Penis, 2008
 Love on the Line (EP) or the title song, by Whitecross, 1988
 Love on the Line, an album, or the title song, by Tommy Seebach, 1981
 "Love on the Line" (song), by Blazin' Squad, 2002
 "Love on the Line", a song by Barclay James Harvest, from the 1979 album Eyes of the Universe
 "Love on the Line", a song by June Pointer, 1989
 "Love on the Line", a song by Karyn White, B-side of "The Way You Love Me", 1988
 "Love on the Line", an episode of The John Larroquette Show

See also
 Love on Line (LOL), a 2009 Filipino film